The Pathological Society of London was founded in 1846 for the "cultivation and promotion of Pathology by the exhibition and description of specimens, drawings, microscopic preparations, casts or models of morbid parts."

Its first meeting was held in February 1847 at which C. J. B. Williams was elected as the society's first president and 106 members enrolled. Early members included Richard Bright, Golding Bird, William Gull, William Jenner, Henry Bence Jones and Richard Quain.

The society published 58 volumes of the Transactions of the Pathological Society of London.

In 1907 it was merged with the Royal Medical and Chirurgical Society of London and other societies to become the Royal Society of Medicine.

Presidents

References
Footnotes

Sources

 
 

Scientific societies based in the United Kingdom
Medical and health organisations based in London
1846 establishments in England
Medical associations based in the United Kingdom
Organisations based in the City of London
Pathology organizations
Professional associations based in the United Kingdom
Science and technology in London
Scientific organizations established in 1846